Marcelo Ribeiro may refer to:

 Marcelo Ribeiro (actor) (born 1970), Brazilian actor
 Marcelo Ribeiro (footballer) (born 1997), Brazilian football player